Marcelo Ernesto Pagani (born August 19, 1941, in Santa Fe, Argentina) is a former Argentine footballer who played for clubs of Argentina, Chile and Italy and the Argentina national football team in the FIFA World Cup Chile 1962.

Teams
 Rosario Central 1952-1961
 River Plate 1962
 Inter Milan 1962-1963
 Messina 1963-1964
 Mantova 1964-1965
 Rosario Central 1966-1967
 Deportes Concepción 1968
 Audax Italiano 1969-1970

Titles
 Inter Milan 1962-1963 (Serie A Italian Championship)

External links
 
 

\

1941 births
Living people
Argentine footballers
Argentine expatriate footballers
Argentina international footballers
Serie A players
Chilean Primera División players
Argentine Primera División players
Inter Milan players
Rosario Central footballers
Club Atlético River Plate footballers
Audax Italiano footballers
Deportes Concepción (Chile) footballers
Expatriate footballers in Chile
Argentine expatriate sportspeople in Chile
Expatriate footballers in Italy
Argentine expatriate sportspeople in Italy
1962 FIFA World Cup players
Footballers from Santa Fe, Argentina
Association football forwards